Euroea or Eurœa (or Eurea) may refer to :

 Euroea (Epirus), ancient city and bishopric in Epirus, Greece
 Euroea (Phoenicia) (or Evaria), ancient city and bishopric in modern Syria